Kazimierz Andrzej Jaworski (28 November 1897 – 6 September 1973) was a Polish philologist, teacher, poet, translator and publisher. He used the pseudonym KAJ. He was born in Siedliszcze. His parents were Edward Jaworski and Maria Jaworska née Smoleńska. He lived in Chełm. During World War I he was deported to Kharkiv, where he started studying medicine in the years 1917–1918. After he had come back to Poland, he studied Polish philology at Catholic University of Lublin (today John Paul II Catholic University of Lublin and at University of Warsaw. In interwar Poland, he was the founder and editor of an important literary magazine, Kamena. In 1924 he published his first book named  (To a red and white mistress). During World War II, he taught underground classes, was eventually arrested and imprisoned in the Sachsenhausen concentration camp. After the war he translated many works from Russian language, and became the editor of the reestablished Kamena magazine. He also translated from Czech and Slovak. Among his translations is the poem Edison by Vítězslav Nezval. In the years 1971-1974 Wydawnictwo Lubelskie published Jaworski's Pisma (Collected Works) in twelve volumes.

References

Bibliography
 Waldemar Michalski, . . TAWA, Lublin 2014.
 Kazimierz Prus, Słupsk 1981.

1897 births
1973 deaths
Polish translators
National University of Kharkiv alumni
20th-century Polish poets
20th-century translators
Polish male poets
20th-century Polish male writers